Turbo Kid is a 2015 Canadian sci-fi splatter action comedy film written and directed by François Simard, Anouk Whissell, and Yoann-Karl Whissell. The film stars Munro Chambers, Laurence Leboeuf, Michael Ironside, Edwin Wright, Aaron Jeffery, and Romano Orzari. The film follows the adventures of The Kid, a teenage comic book fan turned superhero in the "Wastelands", an alternate 1997 post-apocalyptic Earth where water is scarce. He teams up with a mysterious girl named Apple and an arm-wrestling cowboy named Frederick to stop the tyrannical warlord Zeus. Epic Pictures Group released the film in the United States on August 28.

Plot
In an alternate 1997, a post-apocalyptic society lives in a land nicknamed "The Wasteland" that is littered with trash and ruled by a sadistic and tyrannical overlord named Zeus, who uses a device to grind captives into water. The Kid, a teenage comic book fan, scavenges the wastes on his BMX bike to trade with junk dealer Bagu. After trading for water and his favorite comic book Turbo Rider, The Kid runs into Apple, a mysterious, free-spirited young woman. Frightened by her quirky personality and aggressive attempts to befriend him, he flees to his bunker, only to find she has followed him. When she hands him the comic book that he dropped, he reluctantly allows her to stay with him.

As The Kid teaches Apple his rules on how to survive in the Wasteland, they grow closer, and The Kid develops a crush on her. When one of Zeus' henchmen kidnaps Apple, she urges him to flee. He narrowly avoids capture when he accidentally discovers the remains of the real Turbo Rider. After taking Turbo Rider's armor and wrist weapon, he sets off to rescue Apple. At the same time, Frederick, a champion arm-wrestling cowboy, is captured while attempting to rescue his brother. After cutting off Frederick's right hand, Zeus throws him into an arena with Apple. The Kid arrives to intervene, but his wrist weapon fails to fire due to a low charge. He is then captured and thrown into the arena, where he, Frederick, and Apple defeat Zeus' warriors and escape.

The Kid discovers that Apple is a robot after seeing her survive a gunshot during their escape. She tells him that she is a friendship model. Because of damage to her circuitry, they contact Bagu, who directs them to the robot graveyard, where they can find spare parts.  When Bagu is captured and tortured to death, he reveals their location to Zeus, who sends his henchmen. The Kid and Apple evade capture during the chase, but Apple is decapitated by Skeletron, Zeus' lead henchman. The Kid attaches Apple's head to a new robot body and falls unconscious to the graveyard's toxic fumes. He later wakes to find that Frederick, who now has a robotic hand, has rescued him; Frederick says Apple could not be reactivated. They return to Zeus' camp to kill him.

The Kid reveals that Zeus killed his parents for their water when he was a child. Although Frederick and The Kid defeat many of Zeus' henchmen, The Kid is about to be killed when Apple shows up and rescues him. Upset at his men's incompetence, Zeus shoots The Kid, Apple, and Frederick. The Kid is saved by a tin case of View-Master discs he keeps under Turbo Rider's armor. Using the wrist weapon, he blasts Zeus and his remaining henchmen. However, Zeus rises and reveals himself also to be a robot, a corporate model designed to ruthlessly conquer all competition. The Kid blows him up by shooting explosives that Frederick brought along with them.  Apple dies while protecting The Kid from the blast. The explosion reveals a fresh water source underneath the site.

After The Kid buries Apple, Frederick invites him to stay and help him deliver water to the people of the Wasteland. The Kid declines and rides off to explore the wastelands.

Cast

Production
The film originated as T Is for Turbo, a submission for the "T" segment in Ant Timpson's horror anthology The ABCs of Death. Though it wasn't selected, Timpson was impressed and approached the filmmakers to expand their idea into a feature.

Release
The film premiered at the Sundance Film Festival on January 26, 2015. The film was released on August 28, 2015, by Epic Pictures Group.

Reception
The site's consensus reads: "A nostalgic ode to kids' movies of yesteryear, Turbo Kid eyes the past through an entertaining – albeit surprisingly gory – postmodern lens." On Metacritic, which assigns a normalized rating, the film has a score of 60 out of 100 based on 6 critics, indicating "mixed or average reviews".

Simon Abrams of RogerEbert.com awarded it two out of four stars, saying: "Turbo Kid may be aimed at adults, but its infantilizing vintage fetish makes an otherwise cute action-adventure a bad blast to the past." Consequence of Sound awarded it a B+, saying, "Turbo Kid captures the wildly discordant dreams of any budding movie lover when they were 10, creating one of the funniest works of sandbox cinema made to date. Turbo Kid is here to play, and he's loads of fun." We Got This Covered awarded it four out of five stars, saying, "Turbo Kid is a magical can't-miss experience that's like a Saturday morning cartoon turned into an apocalyptic 80s fever-dream. A stunning visual masterpiece that redefines the phrase 'low-budget filmmaking'." Dread Central awarded it five out of five stars, saying, "Funny, gory, hugely enjoyable and – most importantly – shining with spirit, Turbo Kid is a wild success. Everyone involved should be thoroughly proud of themselves." Bloody Disgusting said, "The Final Word: There’s no two ways around it, Turbo Kid is an absolute blast and deserves all the love and praise that it's been given! I loved every second of it and it’s one of those movies that I want to watch over and over."

Box office

Turbo Kid played in 31 cinemas across the United States and grossed a domestic total of $67,069.

Sequel
On September 28, 2016, a sequel to the film was officially announced. One day before the announcement, Le Matos released the official music video for their track "No Tomorrow", which serves as a prequel to the original film.

Video game
A video game adaptation of the film is being developed by Outerminds, scheduled to release in 2022.

See also
Commando Ninja
Kung Fury

References

External links
 
 
 
 
 Turbo Kid at Library and Archives Canada

2015 films
2010s science fiction comedy films
2015 science fiction action films
2010s superhero films
Canadian science fiction action films
Canadian alternative history films
English-language Canadian films
Canadian science fiction comedy films
Canadian coming-of-age comedy films
New Zealand alternative history films
New Zealand coming-of-age comedy films
New Zealand science fiction action films
2010s English-language films
2015 action comedy films
Android (robot) films
Canadian black comedy films
Canadian films about revenge
New Zealand films about revenge
Films set in 1997
Films shot in Montreal
Canadian post-apocalyptic films
Teen superhero films
New Zealand comedy horror films
New Zealand post-apocalyptic films
New Zealand science fiction comedy films
2010s exploitation films
Canadian splatter films
New Zealand splatter films
2010s Canadian films